Live in New York City is a posthumous live album by English rock musician John Lennon with the Plastic Ono Elephant's Memory Band. It was prepared under the supervision of his widow, Yoko Ono, and released in 1986 as his second official live album, the first being Live Peace in Toronto 1969.

Performances
Recorded on 30 August 1972 at Madison Square Garden in New York City, Lennon performed two shows, one in the afternoon and one in the evening, a benefit concert for the Willowbrook State School for Retarded Children in New York,  at friend Geraldo Rivera's request. Rivera introduces Lennon and Ono at the beginning of the album, and he is referenced in Lennon's impromptu revised lyrics in the opening song, "New York City".

The benefit concerts, billed as One to One, also featured other performers in addition to Lennon, including Stevie Wonder, Roberta Flack, Melanie Safka and Sha Na Na, although their performances are not included on this album, nor on the simultaneous video release.

Live in New York City captures Lennon's last full-length concert performance, coming right after the release of Some Time in New York City. Backing Lennon and Ono were Elephant's Memory, who had served as Lennon and Ono's backing band on Some Time in New York City. Although the material Lennon performed was largely drawn from his three most recent albums of the period (John Lennon/Plastic Ono Band, Imagine and Some Time in New York City), he also included in the setlist his solo hit "Instant Karma!", his Beatles hit "Come Together" and paid tribute to Elvis Presley with "Hound Dog" before leading the audience in a singalong of "Give Peace a Chance". "Come Together", originally in the key of D minor, was performed in E minor.

Criticism and editing
Upon its early 1986 release, Ono was criticised by former members of Elephant's Memory for using the first – and weaker – performance instead of the stronger evening show. They also took issue with the simultaneous video release of the concert, which it was alleged had been edited to show Ono as prominently as Lennon. However, on the album release, Ono's vocal performances on such numbers as "Hound Dog" had been mixed out completely. Additionally, all of her solo performances, which included "Sisters, O Sisters", "Born in a Prison", "We're All Water", "Don't Worry Kyoko (Mummy's Only Looking for Her Hand in the Snow)", "Move on Fast" and "Open Your Box", were deleted from the audio edition of the concert, to create a pure Lennon album. The video release retained the Lennon complete set-list and also included Ono's "Sisters, O Sisters" and "Born in a Prison".

Portions of the evening performance later saw release on the John Lennon Anthology.

Live in New York City reached No. 55 in the UK, and No. 41 in the U.S., and eventually went gold.

Historical significance
The concerts documented on Live in New York City were Lennon's only rehearsed and full-length live performances in his solo career, and his first – and last – formal, full-fledged live concerts since the Beatles retired from the road in 1966. Lennon never mounted a tour during his post-Beatles career. The concerts also marked the last time he performed live with Ono or with Elephant's Memory.

In a contemporary review, Cash Box said that "This performance, five years before the debut of The Sex Pistols, presaged, among other modern trends, the whole punk movement." and that "Yoko Ono, the album’s producer, and Capitol are to be commended for bringing these important recordings to the public. "

Track listing
All songs by John Lennon, except where noted.

Side one
"New York City" – 2:56
"It's So Hard" – 3:18
"Woman Is the Nigger of the World" (Lennon, Yoko Ono) – 5:30
"Well Well Well" – 3:51
"Instant Karma!" – 3:40

Side two
"Mother" – 5:00
"Come Together" (Lennon–McCartney) – 4:21
"Imagine" (Lennon, Yoko Ono) – 3:17
"Cold Turkey" – 5:29
"Hound Dog" (Leiber/Stoller) – 3:09
"Give Peace a Chance" – 1:00

Video track listing
"Power to the People"
"New York City"
"It's So Hard"
"Woman Is the Nigger of the World" (Lennon/Ono)
"Sisters, O Sisters" (Ono)
"Well Well Well"
"Instant Karma!"
"Mother"
"Born in a Prison" (Ono)
"Come Together" (Lennon/McCartney)
"Imagine" (Lennon/Ono)
"Cold Turkey"
"Hound Dog" (Leiber/Stoller)
"Give Peace a Chance"

Personnel
John Lennon – vocals, rhythm guitar, keyboards, Wurlitzer 200a electric piano
Yoko Ono – vocals, keyboards, Wurlitzer 200a electric piano, percussion
Jim Keltner – drums
Elephant's Memory:
Wayne 'Tex' Gabriel – lead guitar
Gary Van Scyoc – bass guitar
John Ward – bass guitar
Stan Bronstein – saxophone
Adam Ippolito – keyboards
Richard Frank Jr. – drums

Certifications

References

External links

Unedited audience recording on YouTube

John Lennon albums
Live albums published posthumously
1986 live albums
Capitol Records live albums
Parlophone live albums
Albums recorded at Madison Square Garden
Plastic Ono Band albums
1972 films
Concert films
Films about John Lennon
Documentary films about the Beatles
Plastic Ono Band
1970s English-language films